Bleach: Soul Resurrección (known as Bleach: Soul Ignition in Japan) is an action game based on the manga and anime franchise Bleach for the PlayStation 3. It was released on June 23, 2011 in Japan, July 28, 2011 in Asia, and in Korea on the next day. The fourth Bleach movie, Bleach: Hell Verse, was released on the Japanese PlayStation Store on December 24, 2010. The Japanese visual kei rock band Sid provided the theme song , which is also the anime series' 13th Opening Theme, though only for the Japanese version, as the English version is an rearranged instrumental instead, due to licensing issues.
 
The game was released in North America on August 3, 2011 with a European release following on September 16, 2011, and an Australian release following the week after.

Gameplay
Players utilize the PlayStation 3 controller's analog sticks and four shape buttons to control their character in 3D environment. Players move with the left analog stick while controlling the camera with the right. The X button performs a jump and pressing it again while in air performs a second jump. Melee is performed through the square button which can be utilized for combos.

The triangle button performs spirit attacks which consume spiritual pressure from the pressure bar which sits below the health bar at the top of the screen. Some characters have different spirit attacks based on whether they are on the ground or in the air. The circle button performs special attacks. Specials are strong moves that consume most if not all the pressure bar.

These attacks are different depending on if the character is on the ground or in the air.
L1 is used to lock onto an opponent and R1 blocks. While blocking, the player can use the left analog stick to use Shunpo or Sonído to dodge.
R2 performs a dash maneuver which can be held for a constant dash. L2 activates the ignition gauge which sits at the left of the screen.

Ignition lights the edges of the screen on fire and triples the power of a character's moves. The gauge can be filled by dealing damage to enemies. Once activated, the gauge will slowly drain. By pressing the L2 button again while in this mode, the character will be drained of all their remaining ignition gauge and utilize their ignition attack which is an immensely powerful move and the strongest a character has. The health bar at the top of the screen regenerates slowly as time progresses.

The more damage a player takes, the less health they can regenerate. The pressure bar regenerates quicker so long as the player is not dashing. Dashing also does mild damage. With each hit, a streak bar is refilled. The higher the streak, the higher the soul points multiplier is. 100 for a 2x multiplier, 300 for 3x multiplier and 1000 for a 4x multiplier.

Getting hit does not end the streak. At the end of a level, players are given a grade and extra soul points based on the number of points collected, difficulty played on, clear time, enemies defeated and Ignition attacks used. Once a level is over, the player can head to the level up menu and use the soul points they earned to learn new abilities and power up.

The player is placed on a grid and can only buy upgrades next to ones they have already unlocked. Paths to different grids will be locked until a certain character reaches a specified level. One level is considered buying one upgrade.

Development
The original Japanese version, Bleach: Soul Ignition, was developed by Japan Studio and Racjin. The game was published by Sony Computer Entertainment and released on June 23, 2011. In May 2011, Soul Ignition, was confirmed for release in North America under new name, Bleach: Soul Resurrección. Soul Resurrección, was released on August 2, 2011 by NIS America. The game has a total of 21 playable characters that mostly come from the Arrancar arc.

Characters

Playable characters

Non-playable characters

Reception

The game received "mixed" reviews according to video game review aggregator Metacritic.  In Japan, Famitsu gave it a score of all four sevens for a total of 28 out of 40.

The Japanese version sold 24,725 copies in its first week, while Soul Resurrección debuted in North America with 23,620 sold copies.

References

External links
Official website 

2011 video games
Soul Resurreccion
Nippon Ichi Software games
PlayStation 3 games
PlayStation 3-only games
Sony Interactive Entertainment games
Video games developed in Japan